The lively ctenotus (Ctenotus alacer)  is a species of skink found in Northern Territory, Queensland, and Western Australia in Australia.

References

alacer
Reptiles described in 1970
Taxa named by Glen Milton Storr